Baron Anton von Doblhoff-Dier (10 November 1800 – 16 April 1872) was an Austrian statesman.

Born in Gorizia, he studied law at the University of Vienna then entered into the civil service. In 1836 he retired to cultivate the manor estate of his uncle at Weikersdorf Castle in Baden, where he excelled in agronomic studies. In the course of the Revolutions of March 1848 he became a liberal member of the Austrian Reichstag, or Kremsier Parliament (Assembly at Kroměříž), and trade minister in the cabinet of Franz von Pillersdorf.

Doblhoff-Dier himself resigned from all offices in the violent Vienna Uprising of October 1848. In the next year, he was appointed ambassador at The Hague, a post he held until 1858. In 1861 he became a member of the newly established Reichsrat, from 1867 onwards of the Herrenhaus.

External links 
 Marienthal 

1800 births
1872 deaths
People from Gorizia
People from Austrian Littoral
Anton
Barons of Austria
19th-century Ministers-President of Austria
Members of the Imperial Diet (Austria)
Members of the Austrian House of Deputies (1861–1867)
Members of the House of Lords (Austria)
University of Vienna alumni